The Egyptian Open originally known as the Egyptian Championships   also known as the International Championships of Egypt  is a defunct Grand Prix and Challenger affiliated tennis tournament played from 1975 to 1991. It was held in Cairo in Egypt and played on outdoor clay courts from 1925 to 2002.

Roderich Menzel was the most successful player in singles play winning five times. Ismail El Shafei was the most successful player at the tournament, winning singles titles three times and the doubles competition three times with three different partners; once with New Zealander Brian Fairlie, once with Dutchman Tom Okker and once with Hungarian Balázs Taróczy.

History
The Egyptian Championships or International Championships of Egypt its original name was first staged in Cairo on 2 March 1925 the event was staged 66 times, However Egyptian newspaper sources have given the start date as 1922. The tournament was a regular feature on the pre-open era men's tour from inception until 1967, from 1968 until 1974 it was part of an independent men's tour for tournaments not-aligned to any particular circuit. In 1970 the tournament changed its name to the Egyptian Open. In 1975 he joined the Grand Prix tennis circuit through till 1982. From 1983 until 2002 it was part of the ATP Challenger series. The tournament was hosted annually at the Gezira Sporting Club.

Past finals
Past champions have included:

Singles

Doubles

See also
 International Championships of Egypt (Alexandria)

References

Sources
www.tennisbase.com/Egyptian Championships (currently Egyptian Open) Roll of Honor

External links
 ATP tournament profile

 
Clay court tennis tournaments
Tennis tournaments in Egypt
Grand Prix tennis circuit
Defunct tennis tournaments in Egypt
Defunct sports competitions in Egypt